Gamo (Buta) and Ningi are an apparently extinct Kainji dialect cluster of Nigeria.

References

East Kainji languages
Languages of Nigeria
Extinct languages of Africa